Jinghong is a county-level city in Yunnan, China. Jinghong is also used as a given name, sometimes romanized as Ching-hung in the Wade–Giles scheme. Notable people with the name Jinghong include:

 Li Jinghong, Chinese chemist of Mongol ethnicity
 Jean Chen Shih, biochemist, born Chen Jinghong 
 Wang Jinghong (died c. 1434), a Ming dynasty Chinese marine

Chinese given names